Inal Sharipovich Aflitulin was born in 22 March, 1988 in Astrakhan, Russia. He is a Russian handball player who plays for Victor Stavropol and the Russian national team.

References

External links

1988 births
Living people
Tatar people of Russia
Tatar sportspeople
Russian male handball players
Sportspeople from Astrakhan
HC Motor Zaporizhia players